Hugh Bromell (born January 2, 1994) is a former Australian rules footballer who played with Melbourne in the Victorian Football League (VFL).

Notes

External links 

1944 births
Living people
Australian rules footballers from Victoria (Australia)
Melbourne Football Club players
Hamilton Football Club players
People educated at Geelong College